Fiorentina is a village in Tuscany, central Italy, administratively a frazione of the comune of Piombino, province of Livorno. At the time of the 2011 census its population was 176.

Fiorentina is about 75 km from Livorno and 4 km from Piombino.

References 

Frazioni of Piombino